Marasim is a Pakistani television series aired on A-Plus TV during 2014. It is produced by Humayun Saeed and Shahzad Nasib under Six Sigma Plus. It has Urwa Hocane, Ahsan Khan and Sonya Hussain in lead roles.

Plot
Dawood and Momina are cousins who love and wish to marry each other. But their relationship falls prey to the bitterness and enmity between their respective mothers, Geti Ara and Sheher Bano. The lovers are separated. Dawood is forced to marry Nayab, the girl chosen by his mother. Momina marries Fahad. But Dawood and Momina are unable to forget each other or to wholeheartedly accept their new partners. Things take a turn when Momina and Dawood again try to unite because Dawood finds out he has cancer at the last stage.

Cast 

Ahsan Khan as Dawood
Urwa Tul Wusqa as Nayab
Saba Hameed as Geti Ara
Soniya Hussain as Momina
Zaheen Tahira as Durdana
Sajid Shah as Imdad
Sadia Faisal as Deeba
Naila Jaffri as Sheher Bano
Furqan Qureshi as Abdulla
Badar Khalil as Dadi
Hajra Khan as almas

Soundtrack 
The OST title song (Silsile Tod Gaya) of Marasim drama is sung by Humera Channa and composed by Waqar Ali.

Awards and nomination
Lux Style Awards - Best Television Play - Nominated
Lux Style Awards - Best Television Writer - Zanjabeel Asim Shah

References

Pakistani drama television series
A-Plus TV original programming